Neuhorst is a small hamlet in Saskatchewan, Canada about 30 minutes north of Saskatoon.  Neuhorst is a part of rural municipality Corman Park No. 344 and is located near Saskatchewan Highway 305.

Demographics 

References 

Corman Park No. 344, Saskatchewan
Designated places in Saskatchewan
Organized hamlets in Saskatchewan